Katranide (9th century) was the first Queen of the Bagratid Kingdom and member of the Bagratuni Dynasty. She was the wife of the first Bagratuni king - Ashot the Great (885-890). Katranide is known for her khachkar (879), which is situated in Garni, Armenia.

Little is known about her ancestors. Despite that, the names of their children and grandsons are known.

They had 4 sons and 3 daughters

Family tree

References

Sources 
 Cyril Tumanoff, Manuel de Généalogie et de Chronologie pour l'Histoire de la Caucasie Chrétienne (Arménie-Géorgie-Albanie)
 Armenian Soviet Encyclopedia
 René Grousset, Histoire de l'Arménie
 Continuité des élites à Byzance durant les siècles obscurs

Armenian queens consort
Bagratuni dynasty
9th-century Armenian women